Genaro V. Vásquez (1892–1967) was a Mexican lawyer.

1892 births
1967 deaths
National Autonomous University of Mexico alumni
20th-century Mexican judges
Institutional Revolutionary Party politicians
Attorneys general of Mexico
Supreme Court of Justice of the Nation justices
People from Oaxaca